Lake Josephine is a freshwater lake in Highlands County, Florida, located between the city of Sebring and the town of Lake Placid. Lake Josephine's south and west sides are bordered in most places by residential areas. The east shore is bordered by a mixture of residences and woods. The northeast shore is bordered by a part of Lake Josephine RV Resort and almost the entire north side of the lake is bordered by woods. Parts of the lake are swampy.

Lake Josephine has public access at three public boat ramps, all three on the south side of the lake.

References

Josephine
Josephine